"The Blue Men" was an American television play broadcast on January 15, 1959 as part of the CBS television series, Playhouse 90.  John Frankenheimer was the director and Alvin Boretz the writer. The cast included Edmond O'Brien and Jack Warden.

Plot
The career of veteran New York police detective Roy Brenner is put on a departmental trial after he refuses to file charges against a boy accused of theft and an influential businessman questions his integrity.

Cast
The cast included the following:

 Edmond O'Brien as Roy Brenner
 Jack Warden as Joe Cushing
 Eileen Heckart as Rose
 Cameron Prud'homme as Capt. Marshak
 James Westerfield as Mack Harris
 David Lewis as Lanier
 Rafael Campos as Jules Roman
 Richard LePore as Ernie

Production
The program aired on January 1, 1959, on the CBS television series Playhouse 90. John Frankenheimer was the director and Alvin Boretz the writer.

References

1959 American television episodes
Playhouse 90 (season 3) episodes
1959 television plays